Kolontár is a village in Veszprém county, Hungary.

Soil pollution disaster 

On 4 October 2010 a 1.5–4 meter high wave of red mud flooded the village from a plant nearby causing nine deaths and several severe chemical burn injuries. Six bodies were found in the mud and three other victims died later in a hospital after the incident. Hundreds of village inhabitants had to evacuate.

References

External links 
 Street map (Hungarian)

Populated places in Veszprém County